Ctenolepisma rothschildi is a species of silverfish in the family Lepismatidae. It is found in Africa, Australia, the Caribbean Sea, Europe and Northern Asia (excluding China), Central America, North America, Oceania, South America, and Southern Asia.

References

Further reading

 

Lepismatidae
Articles created by Qbugbot
Insects described in 1907